The 2012 Icelandic Men's Football League Cup was the 17th season of the Icelandic Men's League Cup, a pre-season professional football competition in Iceland. The competition started on 16 February 2012 and concluded on 28 April 2012. Valur were the reigning champions, having won their second League Cup the year before.

The 24 teams from the Úrvalsdeild karla and 1. deild karla were divided into 3 groups of 8 teams. Every team played every other team of its group once, home, away or on a neutral ground. In a change from last year's competition, eight clubs again progress to the knockout stages of the competition. Each group winner, each group runner-up and the best two third-place finishes will enter the quarter finals.

Although ÍA qualified for the elimination phase, they had already planned a tour, so they canceled their further participation, which gave Víkingur R. the opportunity to win the trophy. On 18 April it was confirmed that Víkingur used an illegal player at their game against Stjarnan, which originally ended 2−2. FSI awarded a 3-0 victory to Stjarnan, so they played in the quarterfinals.

Group stage
The games were played from 16 February to 15 April 2012.

Group 1

Group 2

Group 3

Knockout-round
The eight progressed teams played a knockout-round to determine the winner of the 2012 League Cup.

Quarterfinals
The games were played on 18 and 19 April 2012.

Semifinals
The games were played on 23 April 2012.

Final

References

External links
 Icelandic FA
 Results at gooooal.com
 Results at www.futbol24.com

Deildabikar
Deildabikar
Icelandic Men's Football League Cup